This article shows all participating team squads at the 2020 Women's European Water Polo Championship.

Age, caps and clubs are as of 12 January 2020.

Group A

Croatia
Head coach: Marijo Ćaleta

Greece
Head coach: Georgios Morfesis

Hungary
Head coach: Attila Bíró

Russia
Head coach: Alexandr Gaidukov

Serbia
Head coach: Dragana Ivković

Slovakia
Head coach: Milán Heinrich

Group B

France
Head coach: Florian Bruzzo

Germany
Head coach: Arno Troost

Israel
Head coach: Dimitrios Mavrotas

Italy
Head coach: Paolo Zizza

Netherlands
Head coach: Arno Havenga

Spain
Head coach: Miki Oca

References

Women
Women's European Water Polo Championship
European Water Polo Championship squads
European Championship